The Canton of Aix-en-Provence-IV or Aix-en-Provence-Sud-Ouest is a former canton in the Bouches-du-Rhône department of France. It was created 27 February 2003 by the decree 2003-156. It was disbanded following the French canton reorganisation which came into effect in March 2015. At 70,749 inhabitants (2012), it was the most populous canton in France.

Elected to represent the canton in the General Council of Bouches-du-Rhône : 
 André Guinde (Socialist Party (France), 2004–2010)

 Composition 
The canton is made up of the following communes:

 Aix-en-Provence (southwest : 58,003 inhabitants'')
 Éguilles
 Meyreuil

Villages of Aix included in the canton 
 Luynes
 Les Milles
 Les Granettes
 Brédasque
 Jas-de-Bouffan
 Pont-de-l'Arc
 La Parade
 Célony
 La Beauvalle
 Les Deux-Ormes
 Saint-Mitre

See also 
 Arrondissement of Aix-en-Provence
 Cantons of the Bouches-du-Rhône department
 Communes of the Bouches-du-Rhône department

References

Aix-en-Provence-IV
Aix-en-Provence
2015 disestablishments in France
States and territories disestablished in 2015